Gainesville is an Amtrak intercity train station in Gainesville, Texas. The station, called the Historic Santa Fe Depot in Gainesville, was originally built as an Atchison, Topeka and Santa Fe Railway Depot in 1902. It housed a Harvey House Restaurant until 1931. The station saw no passenger rail service from December 5, 1979, when the last Amtrak Lone Star operated, until June 15, 1999, when the first Amtrak Heartland Flyer came through. The Santa Fe Railway deeded the depot to the city on October 19, 1981; however, its restoration was not completed until 2001. A museum is located on the first floor, and upstairs are city offices and a replica of a Harvey House overnight stay quarters.

See also

National Register of Historic Places listings in Cooke County, Texas
Recorded Texas Historic Landmarks in Cooke County

References

External links

Heartland Flyer -- Gainesville
Gainesville Amtrak & Former Santa Fe Station (USA Rail Guide -- Train Web)
Gainesville, Texas Depot (Santa Fe Surviving Depots)

Amtrak stations in Texas
Atchison, Topeka and Santa Fe Railway stations
Railway stations on the National Register of Historic Places in Texas
Railway stations in the United States opened in 1902
Gainesville, Texas
Transportation in Cooke County, Texas
Buildings and structures in Cooke County, Texas
National Register of Historic Places in Cooke County, Texas
Recorded Texas Historic Landmarks